AstroPay is an online payment service that enables users to purchase online on international sites. It was founded in 2006, to meet the needs of those who wanted to make online purchases and could not access an international credit card. Using Astropay’s solutions, users can pay for their online purchases with local payment methods and in their local currency.

The app uses more than 200 payment methods including Banco do Brasil, Caixa, Bradeso, Boleto, PhonePe, Airtel, Google Pay, Visa and Mastercard. Mikael Lijtenstein is the current CEO. It has offices in the United Kingdom and South America, and currently has over 6 million users.

History 
Astropay was launched in 2009 with the product; Astropay Card.

Since then, the company has spread its activity throughout Latin America, as well as to Asia, Africa and Europe.

Astropay has extensive experience in managing the specific needs of emerging markets, allowing them to offer an efficient and reliable solution to all of their customers, users and merchants, no matter where they are located.

With offices in the UK and Latin America, AstroPay is a global payment solution with local knowledge and experience.

AstroPay used to operate in high and low risk industries until late 2015, when its first spin-off, DLocal, was created. DLocal is a payment gateway focused on low risk industries, e-commerce and retail.

As of 2023, features of the digital wallet include loyalty programmes, gift cards and crypto offerings.

Brand endorsements, partnerships 
AstroPay sponsored Burnley Football Club for the 2018–19 Premier League season. In 2021, the app renewed its sponsorship deal with Burnley FC ahead of the 2021–22 Premier League season and also became the official payment service partner for the club.

In August 2021, the company entered into a partnership with Wolverhampton Wanderers for the 2021-22 Premier League season, and the following year, became the team's shirt sponsor.

In September 2021, the company entered a sponsorship deal with Newcastle United Football Club in the English Premier League. AstroPay made arrangements to ensure that branding and logo would be visible on the pitch-side LED advertising during Premier League matches.

In October 2021, it also entered into a sponsorship deal with Sri Lanka Cricket to sponsor the Sri Lanka national cricket team for the 2021 ICC Men’s T20 World Cup. It also marked AstroPay’s debut venture into cricket.

Awards and recognition 
The app was shortlisted as Payment Solution and Innovation of the Year at the SBC Awards Latinoamerica 2021.

Furthermore, AstroPay was shortlisted in the EGR B2B Awards 2022 in the Payment Solution category. The EGR B2B Awards are one of the most recognised awards within the eGaming industry and being shortlisted is a great achievement and acknowledgement.

The company has also been shortlisted in the Global Gaming Awards 2022 in the Payment Solution of the Year category. The Global Gaming Awards are well recognised, reputable and prestigious awards within the gaming industry.

AstroPay has been awarded as Best Payment Method in Africa in the SAGSE Awards 2022. The SAGSE Awards are granted every year as the result of the direct vote of the members of the industry who choose the companies that have performed well in the past 12 months, in several categories.

References 

Online payments
Payment service providers
Financial services companies established in 2009
Mobile applications